Rukwatitan is a genus of titanosaur sauropod dinosaur from the Galula Formation in Tanzania. It lived around 100 million years ago, during the middle Cretaceous. Its fossils were found embedded in a cliff face near Lake Rukwa in the Rukwa Valley, from which it gets its name.

References

Lithostrotians
Dinosaur genera
Cretaceous dinosaurs of Africa
Fossils of Tanzania
Fossil taxa described in 2014